The Waitekauri River is a river of the Waikato Region of New Zealand's North Island. It flows south from the Coromandel Range at the foot of the Coromandel Peninsula to reach the Ohinemuri River six kilometres west of Waihi.

See also
List of rivers of New Zealand

References

Thames-Coromandel District
Rivers of Waikato
Rivers of New Zealand
Hauraki Gulf catchment